The German mark (sign: ℳ) was the currency of the German Empire, which spanned from 1871 to 1918. The mark was paired with the minor unit of the pfennig (₰); 100 pfennigs were equivalent to 1 mark. The mark was on the gold standard from 1871–1914, but like most nations during World War I, the German Empire removed the gold backing in August 1914, and gold coins ceased to circulate.

After the fall of the Empire due to the November Revolution of 1918, the mark was succeeded by the Weimar Republic's mark, derisively referred to as the Papiermark due to hyperinflation in the Weimar Republic from 1918–1923.

History

The introduction of the German mark in 1873 was the culmination of decades-long efforts to unify the various currencies used by the German Confederation. The Zollverein unified in 1838 the Prussian and South German currencies at a fixed rate of 1 Prussian thaler =  South German gulden = 16.704 g fine silver. A larger currency convention in 1857 replaced the Prussian thaler with the Vereinsthaler of  g fine silver, equivalent to 1 North German thaler,  Austro-Hungarian florins, or  South German gulden.

Unification to this system proceeded further due to German Unification in 1871 as well as monetary conventions from 1865 to 1870 expressing a desire to move to the gold standard. For this system a new unit mark was proposed equal to a drittelthaler or  Vereinsthaler, also equal to  the Austrian gulden, but decimally divided into 100 pfennig instead of the existing 120 pfennig. Combined with a gold-silver ratio of 15.5, the new mark of  g fine silver was therefore equivalent to  g fine gold. With 5 billion gold francs (equivalent to 4.05 billion gold marks) secured from France at the end of the Franco-Prussian War, the new currency was launched in 1873 in the form of gold 10-mark and 20-mark coins as well as limited legal-tender silver marks and copper pfennigs. The German Empire's conversion to the gold standard led to the same being adopted in the rest of Europe and North America, as well as the change in standard in the Latin Monetary Union from bimetallism to solely gold.

Despite the Vereinsthaler being a silver standard currency, it remained unlimited legal tender for 3 gold marks until it was demonetized in 1908. The gold-based Bremen thaler was converted directly to the mark at a rate of 1 Thaler gold =  or 3.32 marks. The Hamburg mark courant or currency was converted at 1 mark = 1.2 Imperial marks, and the Hamburg mark banco of the Bank of Hamburg was converted at 1 mark banco = 1.5 Imperial marks.

From 1 January 1876 onwards, the mark and  became the only legal tenders. Before 1914, the mark was on a gold standard with 2790 marks equal to 1 kilogram of pure gold (1 mark = 358 mg). For comparison, from 1900 to 1933, the United States adhered to a gold standard as well with the gold dollar containing 23.22 grains or 1.50463 g fine gold; it was therefore worth 4.198 gold marks. The monetary hegemon of the time when the gold mark was in use, however, was the pound sterling, with £1 being valued at 20.43 gold marks.

World War I reparations owed by Germany were stated in gold reserves in 1921, 1929 and 1931; this was the victorious Allies' response to their fear that vanquished Germany might try to pay off the obligation in paper currency. The actual amount of reparations that Germany was obliged to pay out was not the 132 billion marks cited in the London Schedule of 1921 but rather the 50 billion marks stipulated in the A and B Bonds. Most of that money came from loans from New York bankers.

Following the Nazi seizure of power in 1933, payments of reparations were officially abandoned. West Germany after World War II did not resume payment of reparations as such, but did resume the payment of debt that Germany had acquired in the inter-war period to finance its reparation payments, paying off the principal on those debts by 1980. The interest on those debts was paid off on 3 October 2010, the 20th anniversary of German reunification.

Coins

Occasionally commemorative coins were minted, in which cases the obverse and (much more rarely) the reverse designs might depart from the usual pictorial standards. Many of the smaller states issued coins in very small numbers. Also, in general all states' coinage became very limited after the First World War began. Well-preserved examples of such low-mintage coins can be rare and valuable. The Principality of Lippe was the only state not to issue any gold coins in this period.

Base metal coins
 1 pfennig (copper: 1873–1916, aluminium: 1916–1918)
 2 pfennig (copper: 1873–1916)
 5 pfennig (cupro-nickel: 1873–1915, iron: 1915–1922)
 10 pfennig (cupro-nickel: 1873–1916, iron and zinc: 1915–1922)
 20 pfennig (cupro-nickel, 1887–1892)
 25 pfennig (nickel, 1909–1912)

Silver coins
Subsidiary silver coins were minted in .900 fineness to a standard of 5 grams silver per mark. Production of 2 and 5 mark coins ceased in 1915 while 1-mark coins continued to be issued until 1916. A few 3 mark coins were minted until 1918, and  mark coins continued to be issued in silver until 1919.

 20 pfennig, 1.1111 g (1 g silver), only until 1878
  mark or 50 pfennig, 2.7778 g (2.5 g silver)
 1 mark, 5.5555 g (5 g silver)
 2 mark, 11.1111 g (10 g silver)
 3 mark, 16.6667 g (15 g silver), from 1908 onwards
 5 mark, 27.7778 g (25 g silver)

These silver coins are token or subsidiary currency for the gold mark and are therefore legal tender only up to 20 marks. However, all silver 3-mark s issued before 1871 enjoyed unlimited legal tender status even after the switch-over to the gold standard.

The 5-mark coin, however, was significantly closer in value to older thalers (and other such crown-sized coins).

Gold coins
Gold coins were minted in .900 fineness to a standard of 2790 mark = 1 kilogram of gold (a mark was therefore about 0.3584 g of gold). Gold coin production ceased in 1915. 5-mark gold coins were minted only in 1877 and 1878.

 5 mark, 1.9912 g (1.7921 g gold)
 10 mark, 3.9825 g (3.5842 g gold)
 20 mark, 7.965 g (7.1685 g gold)

Banknotes

Banknotes were issued by the Imperial Treasury (known as "Reichskassenschein") and the Reichsbank, as well as by the banks of some of the states. Imperial Treasury notes were issued in denominations of 5, 10, 20 and 50 Mark, whilst Reichsbank notes were produced in denominations of 20, 50, 100 and 1000 Mark. The notes issued after 1914 are referred to as Papiermark.

Currency signs

Notes

References

 
 

Economy of the German Empire
Currencies of Germany
Currencies of Cameroon
Mark
Modern obsolete currencies
1871 establishments in Germany
1914 disestablishments in Germany
Art Nouveau works
Currency symbols